Find a Heart is an album by Denise Donatelli. It earned Donatelli a Grammy Award nomination for Best Jazz Vocal Album.

Track listing
 "Big Noise, New York" (Marcelle Clements, Donald Fagen) – 6:17
 "Love and Paris Rain" (Russell Ferrante. Will Kennedy, Brenda Russell) – 5:26	
 "Spaced Out (En Babia)" (Geoffrey Keezer, Susan Marder) – 4:23
 "Practical Arrangement" (Rob Mathes, Gordon Sumner) – 3:56
 "Find a Heart" (David Crosby) – 5:32
 "Not Like This" (Jeremy Lubbock) – 4:10
 "Eyes That Say I Love You" (Denise Donatelli) – 5:10
 "In This Moment" (Billy Childs, Donatelli, Marder) – 5:38	
 "Troubled Child" (Jonathan Cain, Steve Perry, Neal Schon) – 5:31	
 "Midnight Sun" (Sonny Burke, Lionel Hampton, Johnny Mercer) – 6:21	
 "Day Dream" (Duke Ellington, John Latouche, Billy Strayhorn) – 5:35

References

External links 

2015 albums
Jazz albums by American artists
Savant Records albums